Brian Lambert may refer to:

 Brian Lambert (politician) (1930–2019), New Zealand politician
 Brian Lambert (footballer, born 1936) (1936–2007), English footballer
 Brian Lambert (Australian footballer) (born 1930), Australian rules footballer